Xclusive Yachts is an operator of luxury yachts based in Dubai, United Arab Emirates.

History
Xclusive Yachts was launched in 2006 by entrepreneur Amit Patel. Amit Patel is the company's founder and managing director.
In 2017, company had launched "High Tea at Sea" concept to provide daytime activities in the middle of sea.

Xclusive Yachts owns 70-plus boats and yachts, most of which were built by German shipyard company Lürssen. 

In October 2022, the company saw an increase in bookings as some football fans booked Xclusive Yachts boats to watch the 2022 FIFA World Cup.

On 6 August 2022, company has started their partnership with Zaatar w Zeit.

Xclusive Yachts has opened "Xclusive Sea School" which is a marine training institute recognized by Royal Yachting Association (RYA).

Xclusive yachts and other most beautiful spots was featured in Dubai Monopoly board.

Yallacompare, a Dubai based insurance company has collaborated with Xclusive Yachts in 2022.

Awards and Honors
On November 8, 2014, Xclusive Yachts awarded with Tatweej Academy Tourism Leaders Award For the UAE's best Luxury Yacht Charter.
Winner Best Charter Company Middle East 2010, Arabian Gulf Yachting Award.
The company received the 2010 Arabian Gulf Yachting Award for "Charter Company of the Year".

References

Transport in Dubai
Ships of the United Arab Emirates
Motor yachts
Water transport in the United Arab Emirates
Sailing in the United Arab Emirates
2006 establishments in the United Arab Emirates